A Place to Call Home is an Australian television drama series, created by Bevan Lee for the Seven Network, which premiered in 2013. Set in rural New South Wales after the Second World War, it follows Sarah Adams (Marta Dusseldorp), who has returned to Australia after twenty years abroad to start a new life and ends up clashing with wealthy matriarch Elizabeth Bligh (Noni Hazlehurst). The main cast also includes Brett Climo (George Bligh), Craig Hall (Dr. Jack Duncan), David Berry (James Bligh), Abby Earl (Anna Bligh), Arianwen Parkes-Lockwood (Olivia Bligh), Aldo Mignone (Gino Poletti), Sara Wiseman (Carolyn Bligh), Jenni Baird (Regina Standish), Tim Draxl (Henry Fox), and Frankie J. Holden (Roy Briggs). The show was cancelled after its second season, but obtained further funding and concluded successfully after a total of six seasons in 2018.

Cast and characters

Main continuing characters
 Marta Dusseldorp as Sarah Adams, who despite a strict Catholic upbringing, moved to Paris to be with the man she loved, and adopted his Jewish faith. She comes to work for the local hospital near the Bligh family, whom she met while serving as a nurse on the ship taking them back to Australia from Europe. Later, she is astonished to hear a report that her husband is still alive following World War II, and her life again spins into troubled times.
 Noni Hazlehurst as Elizabeth Bligh, the headstrong and stubborn matriarch of the Bligh family. She at first worries that Sarah will endanger the Bligh family's social position, but she mellows over time. She intuits James' homosexuality, since her own husband also had affairs with men, but she pressures James to stay in the marriage as she had done in her own past. Later in the series, she leaves for Sydney to live with her daughter Carolyn, and becomes a less-domineering, more-relaxed person.
 Brett Climo as George Bligh, Elizabeth's son, a good-hearted man who takes Sarah under his protection and gradually falls in love with her. He is Elaine's widower and father to James and Anna, although it eventually emerges that Anna is the secret child of his sister Carolyn and their friend Jack; she was taken in by George and Elaine to spare Carolyn any scandal. His high expectations of James puts his son in danger, until eventually George remembers having once seen his own father kissing another man. George later runs for public office and takes over as lord of the estate. In later years, he has a child by Sarah.
 Craig Hall as Jack Duncan, the secret, past lover of Carolyn and secret father to Anna, who now faces many challenges in his work as a doctor in a hospital run by the Bligh family. He is compassionate and generous, despite his episodic personal problems with addiction and depression, and devotes his energy to helping others. Over the series, he and Carolyn connect with their daughter Anna and reconnect with each other.
 David Berry as James Bligh (regular: seasons 1–4, 6; recurring: season 5), the only son of George and Elaine, who grows up believing Anna is his sister. In spite of his homosexual relationships with local farmhand Harry and fellow student William, he marries William's sister Olivia but, still tormented by his gay desires, he tries to commit suicide. During Olivia's pregnancy, he undergoes electroconvulsive therapy and aversion therapy in attempts to change his sexuality. He feels betrayed when Olivia has an affair, but returns to Ash Park to live for his son. He gets involved with Henry, his father's physician, and later moves to the Riviera in France with William, where he feels he can be fully himself.
 Arianwen Parkes-Lockwood as Olivia Bligh, James' wife, a newlywed from England at the start of the series. She does not know that James is secretly in love with her brother, William. She develops anger toward James for his indifference to her desperate need for affection, but eventually tries to come to terms with his sexuality in the interests of their son, Georgie, and of the family estate. She hides for many months the fact that her baby with James died in the womb and that the baby she brought home is not really theirs.
 Abby Earl as Anna Bligh, the secret child of Carolyn and Jack, who was raised believing she was daughter of George and Elaine. Anna marries a local farmer, Gino, after rebelling against the expectations of the Bligh family. The marriage faces difficulties, however, when Gino goes into debt, and his attempts to expand the farm fail. Anna becomes a novelist and later has a child with Henry.
 Frankie J. Holden as Roy Briggs, a kindly old farmer who lives alone at the series start. He is very generous toward Sarah from the time she arrives in town, eventually offering her a refuge in his small home. They develop an easy, informal, mutually-supportive friendship.
 Sara Wiseman as Carolyn Bligh (regular: season 2–6; recurring: season 1). Much like her secret daughter Anna, Carolyn was the rebel child of her generation. For a long time, she gave up on any relationship with the Bligh family, and has had little contact for years. Once her secret is revealed, she is reunited with her long-separated daughter Anna and they develop an even closer relationship than before. Later on, Carolyn works for Sir Richard Bennett, encountering new problems.
 Tim Draxl as Doctor Henry Fox (regular: season 3–6), the physician who helps to save George's life after he is shot. Henry befriends James, and they realize their mutual attraction is stronger than mere friendship. Henry helps James learn how to be gay without attracting attention, and the Bligh family eventually accepts their relationship as beneficial for James' mental stability. Henry falls under the devious control of Regina, when she blackmails him into supplying her with morphine for her addiction. He moves to Inverness to be with James, but is devastated when James abandons him to live in Europe with an old flame.  In the end of season 5, he has a one-night-stand with Anna Bligh. Towards the end of season 6, Anna gives birth to their daughter, Elaine Elizabeth Bligh, and she and Henry agree to co-parent. Eventually, Henry connects with Harry and begins a romantic relationship. In the series finale, we find out that Henry and Harry got legally married in 2018, both of them in their 90's.
 Deborah Kennedy as Doris Collins (regular: season 4–6; recurring: seasons 1–3), the most widely-known member of the Inverness village, who seems omnipresent on her bicycle. Although she means well, her gossiping ways can sometimes make her seem rude and intrusive. Sarah dislikes her at first, but as time goes on, finds her helpful as someone who always knows who has done what in the village.
 Dominic Allburn as Harry Polson (regular: season 1 & 6; recurring: season 4), Amy Polson's gay brother, who had had a furtive romantic involvement with James when they were teens. Harry again kisses James, which is observed by Bert, who then beats him up, kicks him out, and blackmails James' family. After another severe beating, Sarah helps Harry to settle back into a more stable life at Inverness. Eventually, Harry connects with Henry and begins a romantic relationship. In the series finale, we find out that Harry and Henry got legally married in 2018, both of them in their 90s.
 Aaron Pedersen as Frank Gibbs, an Aboriginal Australian man, a war veteran broken by the effects of his service and by racist treatment. He paints watercolours and is discovered by Carolyn who encourages him to show his work. Frank and Jack bond over their shared military experience. Early in their friendship, Jack remarks that "a bullet can’t tell the colour of your skin. We all took the same risks". Both men learn to trust each other and begin to break free of their self-imposed prisons.

Main departed characters 
 Aldo Mignone as Gino Poletti (seasons 1–4), the young, handsome Italian farmer who has set Anna's heart on fire. He has a real passion for farming and trying to please everybody, but his ambitious business decisions are not very successful.
 Jenni Baird as Regina Standish (season 1–5), the widowed, wealthy, but still money-hungry sister of George's late wife, Elaine. Regina is the opposite of who Elaine had been: cold, bitter, and scheming, she despises Jews and openly displays religious intolerance toward Sarah. Regina has now set her sights on the widower George's inheritance, and would take extreme actions to achieve her goals regardless of anyone she sees as an obstacle. After being committed in an asylum for the murder of Millie Davis and a policeman, Regina is released in 1958. She returns to the town and helps Sarah and George fight Sir Richard's cruel intentions. She succumbs to an overdose of morphine, administered by Sir Richard, at the end of season 5.  He then dumps her body in the river, and it is first thought that she committed suicide.
 Matt Levett as Andrew Swanson (guest: season 6; regular: season 2; recurring: season 1), a somewhat-entitled heir apparent who tries to win the hand of Anna Bligh.
 Ben Winspear as Doctor Rene Nordmann (regular: season 3; recurring: season 2), the long-lost first love and husband of Sarah Adams. First seen only in flashback, Rene had been arrested by the Nazi occupiers of Paris, and had disappeared without a trace. Later, when Sarah is amazed to learn that he is still alive, she travels to Paris to rescue him from the deep psychological damage caused by his long ordeal of imprisonment and torture. Rene has great difficulty adjusting to normal life, and still seems to carry his imprisonment within him.  Much of his behavior is attributable to shrapnel in the brain.
 Brenna Harding as Rose O'Connell (regular: season 4; recurring: season 3)
 Robert Coleby as Douglas Goddard, a retiree who operates a club for Australian war veterans. He marries Elizabeth Bligh but dies in season 5.

Recurring characters
 Heather Mitchell as Prudence Swanson, the wealthy friend of Elizabeth. Prudence socializes with Elizabeth whenever she comes to visit Sydney. As a member of Sydney's upper class, she is very aristocratic and looks down her nose at Sarah when she arrives for a garden party.
 Judi Farr as Peg Maloney, the aunt of Sarah Adams, who writes to her frequently from her home in Sydney. She and Sarah have grown very close, and when Sarah later decides to take a difficult action, she asks Peg for help.
 Krew Boylan and then Amy Mathews as Amy Polson, the maid of the Bligh household, sister to Harry and sister-in-law to Bert. When Regina suspects that James is gay, she manipulates Amy into spying for her, which eventually forces Elizabeth to dismiss Amy with great sorrow. After James's aversion therapy, Amy's face reminds him of her brother Harry, causing him to develop intense nausea.
 Dina Panozzo as Carla Poletti, the mother of Gino. She is very critical of the relationship with Anna and her son, saying that it will never work because she is not Catholic. But when George accedes, she does so as well.
 Angelo D'Angelo as Amo Poletti, the father of Gino
 Jacinta Acevski as Alma Grey
 Scott Grimley as Norman Parker (driver)
 Rick Donald as Lloyd Ellis-Parker, a talented portrait artist on temporary assignment, who seems to offer Olivia the romantic affection she desperately craves.
 Erica Lovell as Eve Walker, sister of Amy Polsen and Harry Polsen, in a turbulent relationship with Bert Ford.
 Michael Sheasby as Bert Ford, Amy and Harry's brother-in-law, a local yobbo who always seems to be looking for a fight. His suspicion of outsiders and religious intolerance make Sarah a natural target, as are the Italian Poletti family, and Harry and James, whose attraction Bert uses to blackmail the Blighs. Bert is found dead in the lake, and the unknown circumstances surrounding his death haunt his former victims.
 Mark Lee as Sir Richard Bennett, a rich and powerful, but unprincipled owner of a major city newspaper. He is used to taking whatever he wishes to possess, including the people around him.
 Conrad Coleby as Matthew Goddard, Douglas' son who returns to town after his father's death. He starts dating Olivia and later asks her to marry him.
 Avital Greenberg-Teplitsky as Leah Goldberg/Gold (Seasons 1 & 2)
 Madeleine Clunies-Ross as Leah Gold, a young Jewish woman living in Inverness
 Elliot Domoney as David Bligh, George and Sarah Bligh's Son. (Seasons 5 & 6)

Production
Development for A Place to Call Home began after Bevan Lee completed his "domestic trilogy" (Always Greener, Packed to the Rafters and Winners & Losers). He took inspiration from film director Douglas Sirk's 1950s films such as Written on the Wind (1956) and All That Heaven Allows (1955). Lee told The Age that he wanted to create a romance-driven melodrama based in the 1950s because people's lives in the present are "relatively bland". He said: "At the end of the day, conflict is drama and we live in relatively conflict-free society. I had to go to a place where there was pain and damage and hurt; after the war there was." The script is co-written by Lee and Trent Atkinson.

Noni Hazlehurst (Elizabeth Bligh) was the first cast member to be announced for A Place to Call Home, on 18 June 2012. Marta Dusseldorp (Sarah Adams), Brett Climo (George Bligh) and Frankie J. Holden (Roy Briggs) were announced a month later, with Dusseldorp leading the overall cast. Newcomers David Berry (James Bligh), Arianwen Parkes-Lockwood (Olivia Bligh), Abby Earl (Anna Bligh) and Aldo Mignone (Gino Poletti), made up the rest of the main cast.

A Place to Call Home is set primarily in both the fictional estate "Ash Park" and the nearby fictional country town of "Inverness" in New South Wales. Inverness was also used as the country setting of Always Greener. Camden and the Southern Highlands in New South Wales serves as the backdrop for Inverness. Ash Park is actually Camelot, a heritage-listed property located at Kirkham, on the outskirts of Camden. Sydney, the capital city of New South Wales, is a third location where major events occur, but most city scenes are filmed indoors, aside from some establishing shots such as historic footage of the Sydney Harbour Bridge.

Filming for the first season began on 9 July 2012 and concluded on 12 December 2012. Season one was shot on a Sony F65 camera, the first Australian television production to do so.

In June 2013, Erin McWhirter of TV Week announced that A Place to Call Home had been renewed for another season. Abby Earl told McWhirter, "We're locked in pre-production in August and then we start filming in September, so there's plenty of time for me to get back in Anna's shoes." The second season started on 11 May 2014 and concluded on 13 July 2014.

TV Week confirmed that a third season had been commissioned. In June 2014, however, the magazine reported that Channel Seven had declined the option to renew the series, and that the cast and crew had been told that they would not be required for a third season.

On 15 October 2014, it was announced that Foxtel had finalised a deal with Channel Seven that would see a third season written by Bevan Lee, produced by Seven Productions, but aired on Foxtel. On 25 October 2014, The Daily Telegraph announced that A Place to Call Home was renewed for another two seasons and would return in late 2015, airing on Foxtel channel, SoHo. It was also announced that all the original cast and crew members would return.

On 16 August 2015 it was announced via the official Facebook page that season 3 would premiere on 27 September 2015 on SoHo. Season 4 premiered on Foxtel's Showcase channel on 11 September 2016.

Season 5 was announced by Foxtel on 16 November 2016. The timeline of season 5 skips ahead from 1954 to the year 1958. Production of A Place to Call Home resumed in February 2017 with principal photography continuing through July 2017. Season 5 premiered on Foxtel's Showcase Channel in Australia starting on 8 October 2017.

A sixth and final season was announced by Foxtel on 6 December 2017, which was noted to be the last in March 2018. The final season began airing on 19 August 2018 and the final episode aired 21 October 2018.

Release

Broadcast

When Seven Network revealed its new television series lineup for 2012, A Place to Call Home was mentioned alongside other titles. Seven Network's Angus Ross said that it would potentially premiere in late 2012, but would not be rushed to air by a certain date unless "casting and other elements" were right. The first season of A Place to Call Home consisted of thirteen episodes. The pilot episode was originally broadcast on 28 April 2013, in the 8:30 pm time slot (previously occupied by Downton Abbey).

International
Shortly after airing in Australia A Place to Call Home started broadcasting on TV One in New Zealand.

Series one and two began airing on BBC2 in the United Kingdom on 17 November 2014, series three on 25 February 2016, and series four on 13 February 2017. The fifth series was promoted to a BBC1 daytime slot, and began airing daily on 13 March 2018. The sixth and final series begins on BBC1 on 11 February 2019.

All six seasons are available for streaming in the US and Canada on Acorn TV. The first four seasons were also distributed to television stations by American Public Television.

In 2020, all six seasons were made available for streaming in Sweden on SVT Play until 17 September, in Norway on NRK TV and in Finland on YLE TV1.

In 2020, the entire series began screening in Greece on ERT2 weekdays from 29 June as "Μια Καινούργια Αρχή" (A New Start).

Home media

Box sets

Notes

Soundtrack
A Place to Call Home – Music from Seasons 1–5 was released on 20 October 2017

Reception

Awards and nominations
Australian Cinematographers Society Awards

Equity Ensemble Awards

Logie Awards

References

External links
 
 
 

2013 Australian television series debuts
2018 Australian television series endings
Australian drama television series
Australian LGBT-related television shows
Costume drama television series
English-language television shows
Period television series
Seven Network original programming
SoHo (Australian TV channel) original programming
Showcase (Australian TV channel) original programming
Television series by Endemol
Television series by Seven Productions
Australian television series revived after cancellation
Television series set in the 1950s
Television shows set in New South Wales
2010s LGBT-related drama television series